La Llena is a hamlet located in the municipality of Lladurs, in Province of Lleida province, Catalonia, Spain. As of 2020, it has a population of 16.

Geography 
La Llena is located 119km east-northeast of Lleida.

References

Populated places in the Province of Lleida